JLI may refer to:

Jewish Learning Institute
Justice League International
Jefferson Lines, an intercity bus company operating in the United States